Geestdorp is a hamlet in the Dutch province of Utrecht. It is a part of the municipality of Woerden, and lies about 2 km northeast of the city centre.

The hamlet was first mentioned in 1272 as Ghersdorp, and means "settlement near grassland". It does not have place name signs. In the mid-19th century, Geestdorp was home to 140 people.

Gallery

References

Populated places in Utrecht (province)
Woerden